Lorna Fitzsimons (born 6 August 1967, Littleborough, Lancashire) is a British business and public sector executive. She was the Labour Party Member of Parliament (MP) for Rochdale from 1997 to 2005.

Early life
Fitzsimons attended St James CE Primary School in Wardle and Wardle High School. She then studied at Rochdale College of Art and Design, followed by Loughborough College of Art and Design where she studied for a BA in Textile Design.

Fitzsimons was the President of the National Union of Students (NUS) from 1992 to 1994, having previously held the position of NUS Vice-President (Education). She was a Director of NUS Services from 1990–4, and of Endsleigh Insurance from 1992–4.

Parliamentary career
In 1997, Fitzsimons was elected as the Member of Parliament for Rochdale, a position she held until her defeat at the 2005 election by the Liberal Democrat candidate Paul Rowen. She was one of the youngest MPs elected in 1997. During her time in Parliament she held various positions, including Chair of the APPG on Kashmir and Secretary of the APPG on Pakistan. She was the Chair of the Parliamentary Labour Party Women's Committee, with 101 women MPs, from 1997 to 2001, and then Vice-Chair from 2001 to 2005. Fitzsimons was PPS to Robin Cook from 2001 until his resignation. She was involved in working to modernise the procedures and practices of the House of Commons in her role as a member of both the Procedures and Modernisation Select Committees.

Career
Fitzsimons runs her own company, Lorna Fitzsimons Consulting Ltd. She was CEO of Britain Israel Communications and Research Centre from 2006 to 2012. Before entering Parliament in 1997, Fitzsimons worked at the Saatchi subsidiary Rowland Sallingbury Casey holding various positions including Associate Director. Her clients included BT, Manweb, P&G, UKAEA and Brown and Root. Whilst at Rowland's Fitzsimons, won the first IPR Young Communicator of the year award in 1995. She was part of the two person team that ran the 'Soap Wars' campaign for P&G. She has held many elected and appointed positions for national organisations, as well as being a member of governing bodies for such institutions as Sheffield Hallam University.

Personal life
Fitzsimons married Stephen Benedict Cooney on 8 April 2000 in Rochdale. She has a step-daughter and step-son, and a son (born in September 2002).

References 

 Times Guide to the House of Commons, 1997, 2001 and 2005 editions

External links 
 
 Losing her seat
 They Work For You
 Ask Aristotle
 BBC page

1967 births
Living people
Alumni of Loughborough University
Female members of the Parliament of the United Kingdom for English constituencies
Labour Party (UK) MPs for English constituencies
Presidents of the National Union of Students (United Kingdom)
People from Littleborough, Greater Manchester
Members of the Parliament of the United Kingdom for Rochdale
UK MPs 1997–2001
UK MPs 2001–2005
20th-century British women politicians
21st-century British women politicians
20th-century English women
20th-century English people
21st-century English women
21st-century English people